Desi DNA was a British television show on the BBC covering Desi (North Indian) art, culture and entertainment that launched in 2003.

In 2004 Desi DNA received the Best Lifestyle Programme award from the Royal Television Society.

The show currently broadcasts on BBC Two and is co-presented by Adil Ray, Anita Rani and Nihal Arthanyake with additional contributions by Nikki Bedi, Sonia Deol, Bobby Friction, Murtz and a number of other presenters.  Waheed Khan, Irshad Ashraf and Sangeeta Sehdev have all been directors on the show.

External links
Desi DNA & Asian Network Presents... (2008) website
Desi DNA Series 4 (2007) website
Desi DNA Series 3 (2006) website
BBC press release concerning award

BBC Television shows